Aarthi Scans and Labs is an Indian radiology and pathology diagnostic provider, headquartered in Chennai. The business has 40 diagnostic centres in India, and is accredited with the NABL and NABH.

History
In 1985, V. Govindarajan and his wife made the decision to establish a polyclinic in the Tamil Nadu town of Kovilpatti. However, they felt a lack of medical tools and technology for MRI scans and diagnostics, and thus decided to found Aarthi Scans and Labs in 2000. The business began as a single state operator and is now widespread throughout India.

During the COVID-19 pandemic, Aarthi Scans and Labs gathered 75,500 Swabs from homes. Additionally, it contributed   to a COVID-19 Relief Fund alongside other donors and offered scans and blood tests to COVID patients during pandemic.

In 2021, Aarthi Scans and Labs signed a contract with Mindray Ultrasound India and partnered with health tech firm Qure.ai.

In May 2022, the company partnered with Indian radiology company Synapsica to provide Spine MRI.

References

Laboratories in India
Indian companies established in 2000
Companies based in Chennai
Radiology organizations